Honda XL185 is a dual-sport motorcycle produced by Honda. It is an updated version of Honda XL175. It has a 180 cc, four-stroke, SOHC engine. Instrument gauge contains speedometer, odometer, and resettable tripmeter.

Mechanically, its engine is similar to Honda ATC 185 ATV. This engine was used as a basis for the version supplied by Honda RSC to Colin Seeley for the hand-built Seeley TL200 trials bike.

The motorcycle has a compression release, also called a decompressor valve, which is connected to the kick starter with a cable, to ease starting.

References

XL185